Sex and religion can refer to:

Religion and sexuality
Sex & Religion, album by Steve Vai

See also
 Religion and sexuality (disambiguation)